The Leavenworth Detention Center was a privately run maximum-security federal prison located in Leavenworth, Kansas. The facility was owned and operated by CoreCivic formerly named Corrections Corporation of America under contract with the United States Marshals Service.

When originally constructed as a 460-bed private prison, it was the first correctional facility under direct contract with a U.S. federal agency. In May 2008 the facility underwent its fourth expansion to increase capacity to 1,126 inmates. It held both male and female prisoners.

In January 2021, President Biden issued an Executive Order which prevented federal agencies from renewing contracts with privately run prisons.  In September of 2021, the ACLU of Kansas coordinated a letter to the White House and Leavenworth County Commission signed by ACLU affiliates and federal public defender offices in four states to close the Core Civic Detention Facility in Leavenworth, amidst reports of horrendous living conditions and deadly violence. , and publicly pushed for the facility's closure. CoreCivic campaigned heavily for the facility to remain open, but the facility's contract was allowed to expire on schedule, without renewal.  As of August 2022, the facility is listed as inactive.

Leavenworth prisons

The Leavenworth Detention Center was one of five state, federal and military prisons in the Leavenworth / Lansing area. The remaining four are:
 Lansing Correctional Facility, operated by the Kansas Department of Corrections
 United States Penitentiary, Leavenworth (USP) and its satellite prison camp, operated by the Federal Bureau of Prisons
 United States Disciplinary Barracks, the U.S. military's only maximum-security facility
 Midwest Joint Regional Correctional Facility, another U.S. military facility

Notes

Prisons in Kansas
Buildings and structures in Leavenworth, Kansas
CoreCivic
1992 establishments in Kansas